Purangor Union is a Union of Satkania Upazila in the Division of Chittagong, Bangladesh.

It has an area of

Geography 
Purangor is bounded by Dohazari in the west, Bandarban in the east, Bajalia in the south and Chandanaish in the north.

Economy 
Most villagers are directly and indirectly involved in agriculture. Here main crops are rice, beans, cucumbers, potatoes and other vegetables. They supply these crops local market and outside. Overall, their financial condition is good. There are also teachers, engineers, doctors, businessmen, bankers and government employees in this village. and it beside Bank of the sangu river it life of purangor union.

Administration
Natun Hat
Hashim Para
Purangor
South Purangor
middle Moneyabad
Moneyagor
Kalinogor
Lotabnia
Fokirkhil
Boitoroni
Shilghata

Education 
There are only 1 high school, 8 government primary school and 4 junior dakhil madrasha in this village.
Remarkable educational institutes are:
Purangor Shah Sharfuddin High School
Purangor Govt. Primary School
middleMoneyabad Govt. Primary School
Fakhirkhil Govt. Primary School
Baitarani Govt. Primary School
Shilghata Govt. Primary School
North Purangor Govt. Primary School(newly Govt.)
South Purangor Govt. Primary School(newly Govt.)
Purangor Shah Sharfuddin Junior Dakhil Madrasha
Rahima salam adorsho ibtedayi madrasha. 
Munira mujaher madrasha. 
Shilgata nure madina madrasha
 Dhalirbari Nurani Madrasha

See More
Madarsha Union
Eochia Union
Sonakania Union
Satkania Upazila

References

External links 
 
 Official site

Unions of Satkania Upazila